Aliabad (also Romanized as ‘Alīābād; also known as ‘Alīābād-e Rend) is a village in Chaybasar-e Jonubi Rural District, in the Central District of Maku County, West Azerbaijan Province, Iran. At the 2006 census, its population was 173, in 37 families.

References 

Populated places in Maku County